Florence Emily Dugdale (12 January 187917 October 1937) was an English teacher and children's writer, who was the second wife of the novelist and poet Thomas Hardy. She was credited as the author of Hardy's posthumously published biography, The Early Life and Later Years of Thomas Hardy, although it was written (mostly or entirely) by Hardy himself in his old age.

Biography
Dugdale was born in Edmonton, London, the daughter of headmaster Edward Dugdale. Florence attended the National Infants School in Enfield for two years until 1886 when she went to St Andrew's Girls School. At the age of 20, her parents paid ninepence per week for her to study at the Higher Grades School.

From 1895 onward, Dugdale's life was centred on her teaching. She began training at St Andrew's Girls School, where she and her sister Ethel received prizes from the Diocesan Board of Education for "Religious Knowledge and a proficiency in secular subjects". In 1897, she became a fully qualified teacher at St Andrew's (her father's school). Dugdale was companion to Lady Stoker, wife of Sir Thornley Stoker, brother of Bram, author of Dracula. 

Dugdale first met Thomas Hardy in 1905 when she was age 26. She became his passionate friend and helper, and stopped teaching in 1908; both to assist Hardy and to begin her writing career. In 1912, she published her first book, The Book of Baby Birds, with Hardy's contribution. In the same year, Hardy's wife Emma died. In 1913, Dugdale moved into Hardy's home Max Gate in Dorchester, Dorset. In 1914, they married at St Andrew's Church, Enfield.

During the marriage, Dugdale found herself increasingly in the shadow of Hardy's first wife (whom Hardy had neglected while she was alive). Hardy's frantic and subdued love poetry—written with Emma in mind—was a cause of embarrassment and misery for Dugdale. Nevertheless, in 1928, when Hardy died aged 87, she was so stricken with grief that a doctor was required.

The Hardys were friends of T. E. Lawrence, and Dugdale attended his funeral in 1935.

Dugdale died at Max Gate, the home she had shared with Hardy, of cancer, aged 58. She was cremated in Woking Crematorium, and her ashes were buried in Stinsford churchyard, where Hardy's heart and his first wife were interred.

Publications 
  Illustrated by Edward Julius Detmold.
  Illustrated by W. E. Evans.

References

External links
 Hardy website
 

1879 births
1937 deaths
20th-century English women writers
English children's writers
Deaths from cancer in England
People from Edmonton, London
Thomas Hardy
Burials in Dorset